Empty is the eleventh studio album by German musician Nils Frahm. It was released on 28 March 2020 under Erased Tapes Records.

The album consists of piano pieces, and was originally recorded for a short film that Frahm had shot. It was released as part of World Piano Day.

Track listing

Charts

References

2020 albums
Erased Tapes Records albums
Nils Frahm albums